Charu Sheel Singh (15 May 1955- 3 May 2021) was an Indian writer and scholar of English language. A treader of the triple path walked by the past great poets Matthew Arnold, T. S. Eliot and Sri Aurobindo, Charu Sheel Singh was a poet, critic and literary theorist. He was not only well acquainted with current schools of thought but also conversant with philosophical theories of the East and the West and the occult traditions, Buddhism and theosophy being among his special areas of interest. He was well known for writing poems and criticism in English. He was a professor of English literature in Mahatma Gandhi Kashi Vidyapeeth. He received the Maharashtra Dalit Sahitya Akademy Award and The Best Writer Award by Penguin International.

He is one of the best mythifiers of the city of Varanasi and his Kashi: A Mandala Poem is the only epic in English language on the city of Kashi

Biography
Charu Sheel Singh was born on 15 May 1955. His father, Pratap Narayan Singh was a Sahitya Ratna and a Poet. He took his master's degree in English from Aligarh Muslim University in 1976. In 1978, he was awarded Ph.D. degree in English by Banaras Hindu University. He was married to Maya and they have a son Padmasambhava. He passed away due to complication arising from asthma on 3 May 2021.

Legacy
Kashi: A Mandala Poem, published in 2007, is considered as one of the very few epics in English on a city. It synthesizes puranic myths with modern science and postmodern theory to create a modern-day epic. It is written in a modern language, with an ancient tradition flowing into the veins of the City Eternal: Varanasi.

Charu Sheel Singh is also known for his unique style of bringing philosophy, yoga and tantra to visit poetry and myths. His poetry is full of instances of this happy confluence of modern with ancient, of traditional with personal and of myths with quantum theory.

Charu Sheel Singh has been reviewed in commonwealth literature, USA. He is also reviewed in a quarterly journal BLAKE from Rochester University. His book Contemporary Literary Theory is listed in Reader's Guide To English Literature published by Routledge publishers, Abingdon, United Kingdom. His originality and strength of mythical imagination has led poetry lovers to work upon his poetry.

Works

Edited Works

 Exiled Among Natives (2013) eds. by Prof. Charu Sheel Singh, Dr. Binod Mishra and published by Adhyayan Publishers, New Delhi

Awards and recognitions

 Maharashtra Dalit Sahitya Akademy Award
 The Best Writer Award, Penguin International

See also
List of Indian English poetry anthologies

References

1955 births
Living people
Indian male poets
Writers from Uttar Pradesh
English-language writers from India
20th-century Indian poets
Banaras Hindu University alumni